A list of NCAA Division I-AA college football seasons since the divisional split in 1978. In 2006, Division I-AA was renamed Division I Football Championship Subdivision (or Division I FCS for short).

See also
NCAA Division I Football Championship, championship game for I-AA/FCS played annually since 1978
List of NCAA Division I-A/FBS football seasons
List of NCAA Division II football seasons
List of NCAA Division III football seasons

References